Ammar Nakshawani (born 1981) is a British Shia scholar, author and orator.

Nakshawani was listed as one of The 500 Most Influential Muslims in 2014. He was a visiting scholar at Columbia University's Middle East Institute and University of Cambridge Centre of Islamic Studies. He previously held the Imam Ali Chair for Shi'i Studies and Dialogue among Islamic Legal Schools at Hartford Seminary.

Early life and education 
Nakshwani was born to Emad Nakshawani, the son of Hujjat al-Islam Murtadha Nakshawani (died 1990), who served as a representative of grand Ayatollah Abu al-Qasim al-Khoei in Kufa. His mother is the daughter of the late sheikh, Muhammad-Taqi al-Irawani. He has an ethnic Azerbaijani background on his father's side . His uncle, Baqir al-Irawani is a jurist and teacher at the Islamic seminary of Najaf. In 1987, his family migrated to England, United Kingdom

Initiatives 
Nakshawani serves as the Special Representative to the United Nations for the Universal Muslim Association of America (UMAA).  In this role, he promotes women's rights initiatives, social development, and religious tolerance. Nakshawani uses this position to speak out for the preservation of cultural heritage, historical art and architecture, and ancient literature.

Prior to joining UMAA, Nakshawani served as the Visiting Scholar of Islamic Studies, at the University of Cambridge in England. In this position, he performed extensive research and academic analysis of ancient Islamic texts, which he has discussed at a number of academic forums.

Career 

In 2014, Nakshawani was included in the list of The 500 Most Influential Muslims (also known as The Muslim 500, an annual publication first published in 2009) in the "Preachers and Spiritual Guides" section.

References 

1981 births
Living people
British Shia Muslims
Alumni of University College London
Academics of the University of Cambridge
Shahid Beheshti University alumni